A skid plate is an abrasion-resistant material affixed to the underside of a vehicle or boat to prevent damage to the underside when contact is made with the ground.  

Skid plates may be used on off-road vehicles, motorcycles and lowered vehicles to prevent damage to the underside. Fake skid plates are also added to vehicles for an off-road look.

Steel skid plate for the protection of the engine and the gearbox.

The advantages:
 Increased resistance against any impact or debris found on the road.
 It covers the front compartment of the car, so the engine is more protected against dust and dirt.
 Longer lifespan compared to skid plates made of plastic or fibre glass.
 It protects the frame, motor and linkage on an off-road motorcycle.

References

Vehicle parts